Amblyrhynchichthys micracanthus is a species of cyprinid in the genus Amblyrhynchichthys. It mainly inhabits rivers and is native to Southeast Asia, and was first described in 2004.

References

Cyprinidae
Fish of Asia
Fish described in 2004